The Hypsibiidae are a family of water bears or moss piglets, tardigrades in the class Eutardigrada.

Subfamilies and genera
 Subfamily Diphasconinae 
 Diphascon
 Hebesuncus
 Paradiphascon
 Subfamily Hypsibiinae
 Acutuncus
 Doryphoribius
 Eremobiotus
 Halobiotus
 Hypsibius
 Isohypsibius
 Mixibius
 Pseudobiotus
 Ramajendas
 Ramazzottius
 Thulinius
 Subfamily Itaquasconinae
 Astatumen
 Itaquascon
 Mesocrista
 Parascon
 Platicrista

References

External links

 
Tardigrade families
Polyextremophiles